American rock/folk music singer Laura Veirs has released twelve studio albums (including one album as part of case/lang/veirs), four singles, an extended plays, a live album and four music videos on Raven Marching Band (United States) and Bella Records (Europe).

Laura Veirs's debut album Laura Veirs, was released in 1999 as an independent album. Following the first album, Laura Veirs had a successful career during the 2000s with the albums The Triumphs and Travails of Orphan Mae in 2001, Troubled by the Fire in 2003, Carbon Glacier in 2004, Year of Meteors in 2005, and Saltbreakers in 2007.

With July Flame (2011) and Warp & Weft (2013), Veirs gained her first international success and chart positions.

Albums

Studio albums

Live albums
 Lore of Ears, (Kelp Monthly, 2004)

Soundtracks
 Hello I Must Be Going from director Todd Louiso, starring Melanie Lynskey, Christopher Abbott and Blythe Danner, Raven Marching Band Records, September 2012

Collaborative albums
 case/lang/veirs, with Neko Case and k.d. lang, (Anti-, June 17, 2016)

EPs
 Two Beers Veirs, (Raven Marching Band, 2008)

Other album appearances
 The Young Rapture Choir (Raven Marching Band, 2006)
 "Yankee Bayonet (I Will Be Home Then)" on The Decemberists's The Crane Wife (Capitol, 2006)
 Sailor System by Your Heart Breaks (Don't Stop Believin, 2006)
 "Dear Avery" on The Decemberists's The King Is Dead (Capitol, 2011)

Compilation tracks
 "Black-Eyed Susan" (demo) on Remote Wing, Knw-Yr-Own, 2001
 "The Water's Gone (But Life Is Long)" (with Danny Barnes) on Shipwreck Day, Knw-Yr-Own, 2002
 "17" on Flotsam and Jetsam: 2005 What the Heck Fest Sampler, Kelp Monthly, 2005
 "Cast a Hook in Me" on The Sound the Hare Heard, Kill Rock Stars, 2006
 An exclusive version of "Nightingale" on Paste Magazine Sampler 39, 2007

References

External links

Discographies of American artists